Barbara Anne Eisenhower (May 30, 1949 – July 30, 2022) was an American interior designer based in New York City.

Early life 
On May 30, 1949, Eisenhower was born in West Point, New York. Eisenhower's father was John Eisenhower, a U.S. military historian and a U.S. diplomat. Eisenhower's mother was Barbara Jean ( Thompson) Eisenhower. Eisenhower's grandfather was General Dwight D. Eisenhower, 34th President of the United States.

Personal life
Eisenhower's first husband was Fernando Echavarría-Uribe, an insurance executive from Bogotá, Colombia, whom she met while vacationing in South America in 1966. They married in November 1968, and six months later had a daughter, Adriana Echavarría (born May 29, 1969). Adriana became a photographer, and was married for a time to Eduardo Mendoza de la Torre, the ex Vice Minister of Justice in Colombia and later a Vice President of Avianca Airlines, who was the only man to have ever testified against the notorious drug lord Pablo Escobar.

Anne Eisenhower was presented at the International Debutante Ball at the Waldorf-Astoria Hotel in New York City in 1967 

In the 1980s, Eisenhower married Wolfgang Flöttl, a hedge-fund manager. Both were figures in the New York charity circuit. Eisenhower filed for divorce from Flöttl in 2018.

In 2019 Eisenhower was living in Manhattan's Upper East Side. She sold the historic Southampton mansion, Claverack, for $35 million in 2010.

Death 
Eisenhower died on July 30, 2022, in New York, aged 73. She was survived by her husband of 31 years, Wolfgang K. Flottl, as well as her daughter (Adriana Echavarría), her grandchildren (Camila Mendoza and Nico Mendoza), and her siblings (David, Susan, Mary Jean).

References

1949 births
2022 deaths
20th-century American women
21st-century American women
American interior designers
Eisenhower family
Debutantes of the International Debutante Ball
People from West Point, New York